Bechium is a genus of flowering plants belonging to the family Asteraceae.

Its native range is Madagascar.

Species:

Bechium nudicaule 
Bechium rhodolepis 
Bechium rubricaule

References

Asteraceae
Asteraceae genera